Yvette Brown may refer to:
 Yvette Nicole Brown (born 1971), American actress, comedian and writer
 Yvette McGee Brown (born 1960), American judge